The C&NC Railroad, also known as the Connersville and New Castle Railroad , is a Class III short-line railroad owned by RMW Ventures, LLC and connects the towns of Beesons and New Castle in eastern Indiana. Beginning from an interchange with the Big 4 Terminal Railroad line in Beesons, it runs north through Fayette County, then through the Wayne County communities of Milton and Cambridge City, then northwest into Henry County through New Lisbon to New Castle, where it joins a Norfolk Southern line.

The C&NC began operations December 22, 1997, with four employees.

External links
US Railroad Retirement Board Determination: C and NC Railroad
Bureau of Transportation Statistics: Freight Railroads Operating in Indiana by Class: 2000

Indiana railroads
Transportation in Fayette County, Indiana
Transportation in Henry County, Indiana
Transportation in Wayne County, Indiana
Switching and terminal railroads